Guam Highway 7 (GH-7) is one of the primary automobile highways in the United States territory of Guam.

Route description
The route provides access to two primary locations: United States Naval Hospital Guam, on the north side of the road, and the community of Agana Heights, on the south side. It runs from a Y-junction with GH-6 near that highway's junction with GH-1 eastward toward Tatuhan Park, a unique hilled and triangle-shaped traffic junction just within Hagåtña. At Tatuhan Park, GH-7 comes down the hill to end at West O'Brien Drive, an unnumbered road that runs roughly south of and roughly parallel to GH-1 and continues eastward to GH-4 and eventually GH-8.

In addition to the Naval Hospital, GH-7 also provides access to Guam's Governor's House, the island's Office of Homeland Security and Civil Defense, and the historic Fort Santa Agueda.

Major intersections

References

007